Masan Baseball Stadium is a baseball stadium in Changwon, South Korea. The stadium has an all-seated capacity of 11,000. The KBO League club Lotte Giants played a handful of their home games in this stadium each season as their secondary stadium until 2011 (with the majority of their games being played at Sajik Baseball Stadium). Masan Baseball Stadium was the home stadium of the NC Dinos between 2012 and 2018, when they moved to the newly built Changwon Baseball Stadium.

References

Baseball venues in South Korea
Sports venues in Changwon
NC Dinos
Lotte Giants
Sports venues completed in 1982